Gholam Khiabany is an Iranian-British media scholar and Reader in Media and Communications at Goldsmiths, University of London. He is known for his works on media in the Middle East and the relationship between media and religion.

Career
Khiabany is mainly interested in the media and social change and the relationship between communication, development and democracy, multiculturalism, culturalisation of terror, the rise of the security state, and anti-Muslim racism.
He is a member of Institute of Race Relations' council of management and an editor of the Middle East Journal of Culture and Communication.

Books
 Iranian Media: The Paradox of Modernity, Routledge, 2010  ISBN 9780415962896 
 Blogistan, with Annabelle Sreberny, I.B.Tauris, 2010 ISBN 9781845116064 
 Media, Democracy and Social Change: Re-imagining Political Communications. Davis, Aeron; Fenton, Natalie; Freedman, Des (D. J.) and Khiabany, Gholam. London: SAGE Publications. 2020 ISBN 9781526456960 
 Liberalism in Neoliberal Times: Dimensions, Contradictions, Limits (ed.), Goldsmiths, 2017
 After Charlie Hebdo: Terror, Racism and Free Speech (ed.), Zed, 2017

References

External links
Gholam Khiabany at Goldsmiths

Living people
Academics of Goldsmiths, University of London
Alumni of the University of Westminster
British media critics
Academics of London Metropolitan University
Year of birth missing (living people)
21st-century Iranian people
Iranian scholars